Flordell Hills is a city in St. Louis County, Missouri, United States. The population was 822 at the 2010 census.

Geography
Flordell Hills is located at  (38.717617, -90.265383).

Demographics

2010 census
At the 2010 census there were 822 people, 313 households, and 213 families living in the city. The racial makeup of the city was 5.8% White, 90.8% African American, 0.2% Native American, 0.1% Asian, 1.3% from other races, and 1.7% from two or more races. Hispanic or Latino of any race were 1.7%.

Of the 313 households 39.6% had children under the age of 18 living with them, 17.6% were married couples living together, 43.5% had a female householder with no husband present, 7.0% had a male householder with no wife present, and 31.9% were non-families. 26.2% of households were one person and 7.1% were one person aged 65 or older. The average household size was 2.63 and the average family size was 3.12.

The median age was 32.2 years. 27.9% of residents were under the age of 18; 12.3% were between the ages of 18 and 24; 27.4% were from 25 to 44; 24.8% were from 45 to 64; and 7.7% were 65 or older. The gender makeup of the city was 46.1% male and 53.9% female.

2000 census
At the 2000 census there were 931 people, 367 households, and 245 families living in the city. The racial makeup of the city was 16.86% White, 82.06% African American, 0.21% from other races, and 0.86% from two or more races. Hispanic or Latino of any race were 0.54%.

Of the 367 households 37.9% had children under the age of 18 living with them, 26.7% were married couples living together, 35.1% had a female householder with no husband present, and 33.0% were non-families. 27.5% of households were one person and 7.9% were one person aged 65 or older. The average household size was 2.54 and the average family size was 3.10.

The age distribution was 31.0% under the age of 18, 9.2% from 18 to 24, 32.3% from 25 to 44, 19.5% from 45 to 64, and 7.8% 65 or older. The median age was 32 years. For every 100 females, there were 78.7 males. For every 100 females age 18 and over, there were 70.3 males.

The median household income was $31,875 and the median family income  was $34,063. Males had a median income of $29,750 versus $23,889 for females. The per capita income for the city was $14,539. About 19.4% of families and 21.0% of the population were below the poverty line, including 30.9% of those under age 18 and 4.4% of those age 65 or over.

References

Cities in St. Louis County, Missouri
Cities in Missouri